Radio Range is a settlement in Saint John Parish, Antigua and Barbuda.

Demographics 
Radio Range has one enumeration district, 14700 Radio Range.

References 

Saint John Parish, Antigua and Barbuda
Populated places in Antigua and Barbuda